Bateshwar may refer to:

Bateshwar, Uttar Pradesh, a village in India
Wari-Bateshwar ruins, an ancient fort city dating back to 450 BC in Bangladesh
Bateshwar, Morena,  an ancient site in Morena district, Madhya Pradesh, India
Bateshwar hills, Purnia district, Bihar, India
Bateshwar Rural Municipality, Nepal